Q95 may refer to:

Radio stations 
 KQSF, in Sioux Falls, South Dakota
 WFBQ, in Indianapolis, Indiana
 WKQI, in Detroit, Michigan
 WQHY, in Prestonsburg, Kentucky
 WQTE, in Adrian, Michigan

Other uses 
 At-Tin, the 95th surah of the Quran
 
 Ruth Airport, a public airport in Trinity County, California